Giovanni Battista Discepoli (1590–1660), also called "Lo Zoppo di Lugano" from his being a cripple, was a Swiss-Italian painter of the Baroque period, active mainly in Milan.

Born in Lugano, Switzerland, he was a pupil of the painter Camillo Procaccini. In Milan, he painted a Purgatory for the church of San Carlo, and an Adoration of the Magi originally painted for San Marcello is now in the Brera Gallery.  Lugano also has some of his works; in the church of Santa Teresa at Como is a picture of that Saint. One of his pupils was Pompeo Ghiti from Brescia.

References
 
 
 Museo Cantonale d'Arte, Lugano: Giovanni Battista Discepoli

External links

1590 births
1660 deaths
People from Lugano
17th-century Italian painters
Italian male painters
Painters from Milan
Italian Baroque painters